"Creatures of the Night" is a song by Dutch DJ Hardwell and American pop singer Austin Mahone. The song was released through Hardwell's Revealed Recordings label. It was premiered by Hardwell at the 2017 Ultra Music Festival at Miami in March.

Background 
On 8 March 2017, Hardwell announced the release of the song on Twitter. Digital Journal reviewed the song as an upbeat and silk-smooth summer anthem with impressive drop and catchy melodies. According to Nielsen Music, the song was streamed 582,000 times in the United States and downloaded over 2,000 times in the week ending 18 May.

Track listing

Charts

Weekly charts

Year-end charts

Release history

References 

Austin Mahone songs
2017 songs
2017 singles
Future bass songs
Hardwell songs
Songs written by Austin Mahone
Songs written by Hardwell